Ávila TV is a public regional television channel based in the city of Caracas. It can be seen in the metropolitan area of Caracas on UHF channel 47 or Inter channel 89, and in the rest of the country on Digital TV channel 25.3 or CANTV TV Satelital channel 15. Focusing on music and culture, it attracts young adults mainly between the ages of 14 and 30.

Avila TV grew out of the Metropolitan School of Audiovisual Production (Spanish acronym: EMPA) which, still hosted in the same building, provides Caracas youth access to a free one-year program on video techniques, both at Ávila's headquarters and at cultural centers.

History 
The channel was inaugurated on July 6, 2006 by then Caracas metropolitan mayor, Juan Barreto. with an investment of about 11m bolívares fuertes ($5.1m United States dollars).

The channel was transferred to the Venezuelan Ministry of Communications and Information, MINCI, as established in the Gaceta Official Nº 39.083 date 18 December 2008, 11 days after opposition politician Antonio Ledezma assumed power as mayor of Caracas. Controversial changes in management and dismissal of employees who volunteer much of their time has caused concern among some of the collective and its audience that functionaries from the national government are trying to stifle the wide-ranging critical voice the station has presented.

In December 2015, a decision was taken to re-politicize the channel and include pro-government news programs, movies and documentaries.

Programming
Ávila TV has a very urban-oriented programming, mostly made by young producers that don't come from the traditional media and have not been formally educated as broadcasters. Avila also holds a school of media producers called EMPA (Escuela Metropolitana de Producción Audiovisual) where they include youngsters and other members of the public who want to learn about media production, trying to attract people from the most populated areas of Caracas. Ávila also features foreign programs from other Hispanic American countries, Spain and Japan, as well as films and documentaries. The varied programming includes both short clips or common 30-minute/1 hour long programs.

Ávila TV is also a radical television experiment, trying to make TV an instrument of social inclusion. Based on a radical narrative of the city of Caracas, its social discourse is built from a different perspective from traditional TV channels. As well as programs on gender issues which tackle the typical machismo perspective, it hosts programs that talk openly about homosexuality and others that address Indigenous and Afro-Venezuelan rights. The channel tries to broadcast a closer or more approximate vision of the working class and particularly the world of young caraqueños.

Current programming

Original programming 
 ¿Dime qué escuchas?
 Son de la zona
 Sin pena ni culpa
 El coroto
 Recreándola
 Vive con cancha
 Arena presenta
 Cápsulas espaciales
 Recreo
 Paisaje sonoro
 Radio crema
 Papaya
 ¿Que hago yo aquí?

Former programming 
 El Aguacate
 Caracas en Directo
 La Chatarra TV
 El Cartel
 Calle Caribe
 El Matineé
 Peluos con Curita
 El Programa Mío
 Rompe la Liga
 Habitante o Ciudadano
 KolectiVoz
 Caracas Tribal
 La Brujula Sexual
 Point 47
 Donde Pisas
 La Bolita del Mundo
 Cara de Vidrio
 Onda Nuestra
 Wataca Saun
 República del Oeste
 Bipolar Idol
 R.P.T. (Rodando, Pelando y Tripeando)
 Guerra Nuestra
 Sabor Bacano
 Urbanautas
 Metalmorfosis
 El Mañanero
 Lo que sea
 El Entrompe de Falopio
 Así mismo
 La Cuadra

See also
 Asamblea Nacional Televisión (ANTV)
 Buena Televisión
 teleSUR
 Televisión Educativa
 TVes
 Venezolana de Televisión (VTV)
 ViVe
 List of Venezuelan television channels

References

External links
 Ministerio del Poder Popular para la Comunicación e Información
 Avila Pendiente's Blog

Bolivarian Communication and Information System
Television networks in Venezuela
Commercial-free television networks
Television channels and stations established in 2006